EDDI may refer to:

People
 Eddi Arent (1925–2013), German actor, cabaret artist and comedian
 Eddi Gomes (born 1988), Bissau-Guinean footballer
 Eddi Gutenkauf (born 1928), Luxembourgian fencer
 Eddi McKee, a fictional character on the BBC medical drama Holby City
 Eddi Nappi, bassist for American band Enemy
 Eddi Reader (born 1959), Scottish singer-songwriter
 Eddi Valenzuela (born 1982), Guatemalan boxer
 Eddi-Rue McClanahan (1934–2010), American actress
 Eddi La Marra, Italian motorcycle racer in the 2013 FIM Superstock 1000 Cup
 Eddi, a name for Stephen of Ripon, eighth-century author
 Eddi, a main character in the UK animated TV series Q Pootle 5
 Eddi McCandry, main character of the 1987 novel War for the Oaks by Emma Bull
 Eddi Projex, American rapper who often collaborates with Stevie Joe

Other
 Ethylenediamine dihydroiodide (EDDI), a water-soluble salt
 EDDI, the ICAO code for Berlin Tempelhof Airport
 EDDI Inc., security company headed by American lawyer Donald E. deKieffer

See also
 Eddy (surname) (including a list of people with the name)
 Eddie (disambiguation)